Leonard Othello Meigs (April 28, 1879 – July 30, 1923) was an American politician in the state of Washington. He served in the Washington House of Representatives. From 1909 to 1911, he was the Speaker of that body.

References

Republican Party members of the Washington House of Representatives
1879 births
1923 deaths
Canadian emigrants to the United States